Simon Deignan (1922 – September 2006) was a former Gaelic footballer for the Cavan county team, and a referee.

Family
His grandnephew is the Dublin footballer Jonny Cooper.

Playing career
A native of Mullagh. Deignan won an All-Ireland Minor Football Championship medal in 1938. He formed a brilliant half back partnership with P. J. Duke & J. J. O'Reilly that won the All-Ireland Senior Football Championship Final in the Polo Grounds, New York in 1947. He was again one of the Breffni county’s stars in the ’48 All-Ireland Final double success. He also won the National Football League in 1949/50 season. He won numerous Railway Cup medals with Ulster.

He was also a noted referee, officiating at the 1950 and 1958 All-Ireland Senior Football Championship Finals.

Death
He died in Bon Secours Hospital, Glasnevin, aged 84. His funeral took place from the Church of Our Mother of Divine Grace, Ballygall Road East to Dardistown cemetery.

References

1922 births
2006 deaths
All-Ireland Senior Football Championship Final referees
Cavan Gaels Gaelic footballers
Cavan inter-county Gaelic footballers
Gaelic football referees
Irish Army soldiers
Irish auctioneers